The flag of Lazio is one of the symbols of the region of Lazio, Italy. The flag is not currently official, but is in common use.

Symbolism
The flag is the coat of arms of Lazio surrounded by laurel and olive branches, surmounted by a golden crown on a sky-blue field with the words "Regione Lazio" in gold.

History

References

Lazio
Lazio
Lazio